Cam Stewart may refer to:
 Cam Stewart (ice hockey)
 Cam Stewart (sportscaster)